Guzmania membranacea is a plant species in the genus Guzmania. This species is native to Venezuela.

References

membranacea
Flora of Venezuela